Lumbriculus is a genus of oligochaete annelids.

Species
Species:

Lumbriculus alexandrovi 
Lumbriculus ambiguus 
Lumbriculus caribensis 
Lumbriculus genitosetosus 
Lumbriculus illex 
Lumbriculus inconstans 
Lumbriculus japonicus 
Lumbriculus kolymensis 
Lumbriculus lacustris 
Lumbriculus mukoensis 
Lumbriculus multiatriatus 
Lumbriculus olgae 
Lumbriculus pellucidus 
Lumbriculus sachalinicus 
Lumbriculus tetraporophorus 
Lumbriculus variegatus

References

 
Annelid genera
Lumbriculidae